Itsaraphap Road is a main road in Bangkok's Thonburi side (west bank of Chao Phraya River), it is also the location of the Itsaraphap MRT Station, the Blue Line extension station and the only underground station on the Thonburi side.

It has a starting point at Lat Ya Junction in the area of Khlong San Subdistrict, Khlong San District, where it meets Lat Ya and Tha Din Daeng Roads then westward cuts across Ban Khaek Intersection, where it meets Prajadhipok Road in the areas of Hiran Ruchi and Wat Kanlaya Subdistricts, Thon Buri District, then spans Khlong Bangkok Yai canal on Charoenphat Bridge and into the area of Bangkok Yai District (this phase it also serves as a delineates line between Wat Arun and Wat Tha Phra Subdistricts) and cuts across Pho Sam Ton Junction, where it meets Wang Doem Road, as far as spans Khlong Mon and into the area of Ban Chang Lo Subdistrict, Bangkok Noi District, where it bends slightly north and cuts across Phran Nok Intersection, where it meets Phran Nok and Wang Lang Roads (this phase it also serves as a delineates line between Ban Chang Lo and Siri Rat Subdistricts), as far as ending at Ban Noen Junction in the areas of Ban Chang Lo and Siriraj Subdistricts near Thonburi Railway Station and Siriraj Hospital (section Siriraj Piyamaharajkarun Hospital), total distance of 4.18 km (2 mi 1,051 yd).

It was built in the year 1931 during the King Prajadhipok (Rama VII)'s reign after the construction of a Memorial Bridge linked between Phra Nakhon and Thonburi sides was completed. It was regarded as one of the 11 roads in the Thonburi area traffic expansion project, along with other roads such as Tha Din Daeng, Phran Nok, Somdet Chao Phraya etc. The road was once called "Chao Krung Thon Road" (ถนนเจ้ากรุงธน, lit: "the road of the King of Thon Buri") not long after its construction, however, the King Taksin Monument was built right in the middle of Wongwian Yai, so the name of the road was likewise changed to honour the monarch who declared Siam’s independence from the Burmese. (Itsaraphap means "independence" or "freedom" in Thai).

Although it is short, Itsaraphap Road runs through important places such as Dhonburi Rajabhat University, Bansomdej Chaopraya Rajabhat University, Wat Ratchasittharam,  Royal Thai Navy Headquarters, Taweethapisek School, Thonburi Hospital, Wat Chinorot and Chinorot Wittayalai School etc. It also runs through three other mosques of Shia sect, namely Kudi Charoenphat, Dilfulla Mosque, and Phadungtham Islam Mosque.

References

Streets in Bangkok
1932 establishments in Siam